Liberated is a 2020 indie action-adventure video game developed by Polish studio Atomic Wolf and published by Walkabout Games. It was released worldwide on Nintendo Switch on June 2, 2020 with a version for Microsoft Windows on July 30, 2020. An enhanced edition released for the Nintendo Switch on December 3, 2020, and for PlayStation 4, Xbox One, and Xbox Series X/S on April 20, 2022.

The game features hand-drawn interactive art in the style of a comic books, with the intent of making the player feel like they're inside an actual graphic novel. The story is a tech-noir/cyberpunk thriller about democracy slipping into authoritarianism.

Reception

Liberated received mixed reviews from critics. On Metacritic, the Nintendo Switch version of the game holds a score of 59/100 based on 19 reviews. The game received praise for its art style and music, but received criticism for its gameplay, level design, and poor performance for the Nintendo Switch version.

References

External links
 Official website

2020 video games
Action-adventure games
Cyberpunk video games
Indie video games
Monochrome video games
Windows games
Nintendo Switch games
Video games developed in Poland